The Battle of Tachov or Battle of Mies was a battle fought on 4 August 1427 near the Bohemian towns of Tachov (Tachau) and Stříbro (Mies). The Hussites won over the armies led by the Cardinal Henry Beaufort of England and Archbishop of Trier Otto von Ziegenhain.

It was part of the Hussite Wars, and it was the first battle in which war wagons were used by the crusaders. The battle showed that the Wagenburg could not be used successfully by just any army. It took an army that knew how to use the wagons to make them successful. This battle ended the Fourth Crusade of the Hussite Wars, and for four years no further crusades were made. This would allow the Hussites to go on their "beautiful rides" into Hungary, Saxony, Bavaria and Silesia.

References

External links
 Bellum.cz – "Battle of Tachov 3rd – 4th August 1427"

Tachov
1427 in Europe
Tachov
Tachov
Tachov
Prokop the Great
History of the Plzeň Region